Democratic elections have been held in Naples, Italy, since the collapse of Benito Mussolini's fascist regime. Today, all residents of Naples who are at least 18 years old and hold an EU citizenship are eligible to vote for the mayor and the 48 members of the city council. They also vote for the president and the 30 or 40 members of the municipal council in which they reside.

Since 1993, Italian mayors are elected directly. In the cities with a population higher than 15,000, voters can choose for a candidate for mayor and/or for a party or civic list that is not necessarily linked to the same mayor-candidate (panachage or voto disgiunto). If no candidate receives an absolute majority, the top two candidates go to a runoff election (ballottaggio) after two weeks. The city council and municipal council elections are based on a proportional system with preferences: for each list, the candidates with the most preferences are elected proportionally to the seats assigned to the list, with the lists supporting the elected mayor being granted around 60% of the total seats to guarantee stability.

Elections are normally scheduled every five years, usually between 15 April and 15 June. The last election was held in June 2016.

Italian Republic (since 1946)

City council election, 1946
The first democratic election after the fall of fascism took place on 10 November 1946.

After the Liberation of Naples in August 1943, Independent lawyer Giuseppe Solimene had been appointed as Provisional Mayor by the National Liberation Committee under approval of the United Nations military government. Between 1943 and 1946 the office had been filled by politicians from centre-left minor parties such as the liberal-socialist Action Party and the social-democratic Labour Democratic Party.

When the authority of the Italian government was restored in 1946, local elections in the whole country were called. Proportional representation and the Westminster system were the principles chosen for the restoration of municipal democracy in Italy.

For the first time, the inhabitants of the city, including men and women, without distinction, could vote for their representatives in the city council. The conservative and right-wing parties, such as the Monarchist National Party and Common Man's Front, received the combined majority of the votes and extensive representation in the city council, while the leftist alliance Popular Democratic Bloc, an alliance between the Communists, Socialists and centre-left minor parties, received just the 31% of the votes. However, the turnout of the election remains noted as extremely low.

Sunday 10 November 1946. Sources: La Stampa , 1946–1955 Local Elections (Italian), Electoral Archives of Naples (Italian)

Notes

City council election, 1952

The incumbent city council's mandate expired in November 1951; however, a new election was postponed to next spring. During the maintenance of the previous council, the national political situation had deeply changed during the previous six years. In 1951, Alcide De Gasperi's government changed the local electoral law to a block voting system, to ensure the leadership of its local administrations. Two thirds of the seats would be assigned to the winning coalition, abolishing  proportional representation.

The election took place on 25 May 1952, resulting in the unexpected defeat of the Centrist Coalition, with a right-wing coalition formed by monarchists and neo-fascists obtaining the majority of votes. The monarchist and former fascist businessman Achille Lauro, who had received almost 140,000 preference votes, higher than any number of votes received by any candidate in a local election up to that point, was elected mayor on 9 July and formed an far-right executive composed by members of PNM and MSI.

Sunday 25 May 1952. Sources: La Stampa , 1946–1955 Local Elections (Italian), Electoral Archives of Naples (Italian)

City council election, 1956
The occurrence of the 1956 election was anticipated by the effect of a new law which ordered a new legislature for a term of 4 years. A varying electoral system was additionally implemented; after Alcide De Gasperi's government had retired in 1953, the 1951 electoral law, based on a block voting system was restored.

In June 1953 the incumbent mayor Achille Lauro ran both as deputy and senator in the national election. Being elected in both the Chamber and the Senate, and despite having received more than 180,000 preference votes in the election for the Chamber of Deputies, he opted to remain in the Senate. However, in 1954, his election was invalidated, since he could not hold the offices of mayor and senator at the same time.

Due to his expulsion from the Senate and to his increasing popularity across Naples, in June 1954 Lauro founded a new monarchist party (People's Monarchist Party, PMP), breaking with the PNM's leader Alfredo Covelli. The new PMP party characterized itself for being closer to Christian Democracy, the support of which was necessary for Lauro to expand and enforce his political strength across the city.

The election, which took place on 27 May 1956, resulted in a landslide victory for Lauro's new monarchist party, with the Mayor himself obtaining more than 260,000 preference votes.

In 1958, after an inquiry sponsored by the national government, several administrative irregularities emerged and Lauro was ousted from the office, after the Zoli Cabinet nominated a special commissioner to rule the city.

Sunday 27 May 1956. Source: La Stampa , Electoral Archives of Naples (Italian)

City council election, 1960
In 1959 the two main monarchist parties (the PMP and PNM) merged into the new Italian Democratic Party, later the Italian Democratic Party of Monarchist Unity (PDIUM). Despite the political scandal that led to a long period of suspension of the democratic institutions of the city, the election, which occurred upon 6 November 1950, resulted in a new political success for the monarchists; their leader, Achille Lauro, was again elected mayor in January 1961, thanks to the support of the Christian Democracy party. However he was forced to resign after 11 months, due to a political crisis that again led to the suspension of the city council and to a snap election in June 1962.

Sunday 6 November 1960. Source: La Stampa , Electoral Archives of Naples (Italian)

City council election, 1962
The snap election, which took place on 10 June 1962, resulted within PDIUM obtaining the largest number of votes, despite considerable losses. For the first time the Christian Democracy party emerged as a possible challenger for Lauro's political dominance. After the election, a new alliance between PDIUM and DC was formed. However, in 1964 another political crisis between the two coalition partners occurred and another snap election was called.

Sunday 10 June 1962. Source: La Stampa , Electoral Archives of Naples (Italian)

City council election, 1964
The snap election took place on 22 November 1964, with the Christian Democracy party becoming the largest party; the monarchists obtained their worst result ever in a local election in Naples during the election. On 27 January 1965, the first Neapolitan centre-left executive was formed and the Christian democrat Ferdinando Clemente di San Luca was elected mayor by an alliance that comprehended DC, PSI and PSDI.

Sunday 22 November 1964. Source: La Stampa , Electoral Archives of Naples (Italian)

City council election, 1970
The election took place on 7 June 1970; this election, six years after the last, took place simultaneously with the first regional elections of Campania. The centre-left alliance was easily reconfirmed as the major political alliance in the city council.

Sunday 7 June 1970. Source: La Stampa , Electoral Archives of Naples (Italian)

City council election, 1975

The election took place on 15 June 1975.

Reflecting the national vote, the Italian Communist Party became, for the first time in history, the largest party within the city council, with 32% of electorate support. This extraordinary result led to the birth of the first red-giunta in the history of the city: a new coalition was formed by the leftist Socialist, Democratic-Socialist and Communist Party, while Maurizio Valenzi (PCI) was elected mayor on 27 September.

A notable fact in the election was the surge of the post-fascist Italian Social Movement.

Sunday 15 June 1975. Source: La Stampa , Electoral Archives of Naples (Italian)

City council election, 1980
The election took place on 8 June 1980 and the Italian Communist Party was confirmed again as the largest party. However, the ruling left-wing coalition was not able to win more seats in the city council and assure a more stable majority. After a political crisis, a snap election was called in 1983.

Sunday 8 June 1980. Source: La Stampa , Electoral Archives of Naples (Italian)

City council election, 1983
The snap election took place on 20 November 1983. Despite notable losses, the Italian Communist Party was confirmed again as the largest party. However, the Christian Democracy party managed to form a transitional centre-left coalition with socialists and social-democrats. In November 1984 a Pentapartito coalition was finally formed and the socialist Carlo D'Amato was elected mayor.

Sunday 20 November 1983. Source: La Stampa , Electoral Archives of Naples (Italian)

City council election, 1987
Another snap election took place on 14 June 1987.

Despite a high degree of fragmentation and instability during the previous years, the Pentapartito coalition managed to obtain again the majority of the seats in the city council. Christian Democracy became the largest party.

Sunday 14 June 1987. Source: La Stampa , Electoral Archives of Naples (Italian)

City council election, 1992
The election took place on 7 June 1992, resulting within a Christian democracy victory.

Sunday 7 June 1992. Source: La Stampa , Electoral Archives of Naples (Italian)

Mayoral and city council election, 1993
The election took place on two rounds, the first on 21 November and the second on 5 December 1993.

|- 
| colspan="7"| 
|-
|- style="background-color:#E9E9E9;text-align:center;"
! colspan="4" rowspan="1" style="text-align:left;" | Parties and coalitions
! colspan="1" | Votes
! colspan="1" | %
! colspan="1" | Seats
|-
| style="background-color:pink" rowspan="6" |
| style="background-color:" |
| style="text-align:left;" | Democratic Party of the Left (Partito Democratico della Sinistra)
| PDS
| 92,475 || 19.76% || 20
|-
| style="background-color:" |
| style="text-align:left;" | Communist Refoundation Party (Rifondazione Comunista)
| PRC
| 41,453 || 8.86% || 8
|-
| style="background-color:" |
| style="text-align:left;" | Federation of the Greens (Federazione dei Verdi)
| FdV
| 18,049 || 3.86% || 3
|-
| style="background-color:red" |
| style="text-align:left;" | Socialist Rebirth (Rinascita Socialista)
| RS
| 12,563 || 2.68% || 2
|-
| style="background-color:" |
| style="text-align:left;" | The Network (La Rete)
| LR
| 9,763 || 2.09% || 2
|-
| style="background-color:" |
| style="text-align:left;" | Others 
| 
| 6,497 || 1.39% || 1
|- style="background-color:pink"
| colspan="4" style="text-align:left;" | Bassolino coalition (Left-wing)
| 180,800 || 38.62% || 36
|-
| style="background-color:" |
| style="text-align:left;" colspan="2" | Italian Social Movement (Movimento Sociale Italiano) 
| MSI
| 145,873 || 31.16% || 13
|-
| style="background-color:" rowspan="4" |
| style="background-color:" |
| style="text-align:left;" | Christian Democracy (Democrazia Cristiana)
| DC
| 46,730 || 9.98% || 6
|-
| style="background-color:" |
| style="text-align:left;" | Italian Socialist Party (Partito Socialista Italiano)
| PSI
| 18,371 || 3.92% || 1
|-
| style="background-color:" |
| style="text-align:left;" | Italian Democratic Socialist Party (Partito Socialdemocratico Italiano)
| PSDI
| 13,882 || 2.97% || 1
|-
| style="background-color:" |
| style="text-align:left;" | Italian Liberal Party (Partito Liberale Italiano)
| PLI
| 6,333 || 1.35% || 0
|- style="background-color:"
| colspan="4" style="text-align:left;" | Caprara coalition (Quadripartito)
| 85,316 || 18.23% || 8
|-
| style="background-color:purple" |
| style="text-align:left;" colspan="2" | Naples Alliance (Alleanza Napoli) 
| AN
| 31,818 || 6.80% || 3
|-
| style="background-color:" |
| style="text-align:left;" colspan="2" | Others 
| 
| 24,295 || 5.19% || 0
|-
| colspan="7" style="background-color:#E9E9E9" | 
|- style="font-weight:bold;"
| style="text-align:left;" colspan="4" | Total
| 468,102 || 100% || 60
|-
| colspan="7" style="background-color:#E9E9E9" | 
|-
| style="text-align:left;" colspan="4" | Votes cast / turnout 
| 589,311 || 67.03% || style="background-color:#E9E9E9;" |
|-
| style="text-align:left;" colspan="4" | Registered voters
| 879,237 ||  || style="background-color:#E9E9E9;" |
|-
| colspan="7" style="background-color:#E9E9E9" | 
|-
| style="text-align:left;" colspan="7" | Source: Ministry of the Interior
|}

Mayoral and city council election, 1997
The election took place on 16 November 1997.

|- 
| colspan="7"| 
|-
|- style="background-color:#E9E9E9;text-align:center;"
! colspan="4" rowspan="1" style="text-align:left;" | Parties and coalitions
! colspan="1" | Votes
! colspan="1" | %
! colspan="1" | Seats
|-
| style="background-color:pink" rowspan="6" |
| style="background-color:" |
| style="text-align:left;" | Democratic Party of the Left (Partito Democratico della Sinistra)
| PDS
| 164,644 || 33.28% || 22
|-
| style="background-color:pink" |
| style="text-align:left;" | Italian People's Party (Partito Popolare Italiano)
| PPI
| 44,438 || 8.98% || 5
|-
| style="background-color:" |
| style="text-align:left;" | Communist Refoundation Party (Rifondazione Comunista)
| PRC
| 31,769 || 6.42% || 4
|-
| style="background-color:" |
| style="text-align:left;" | Italian Renewal (Rinnovamento Italiano)
| RI
| 22,765 || 4.60% || 3
|-
| style="background-color:" |
| style="text-align:left;" | The Network (La Rete)
| LR
| 18,698 || 3.78% || 2
|-
| style="background-color:" |
| style="text-align:left;" | Others 
| 
| 57,063 || 11.53% || 6
|- style="background-color:pink"
| colspan="4" style="text-align:left;" | Bassolino coalition (Centre-left)
| 339,377 || 68.61% || 42
|-
| style="background-color:lightblue" rowspan="4" |
| style="background-color:" |
| style="text-align:left;" | National Alliance (Alleanza Nazionale)
| AN
| 56,094 || 11.34% || 7
|-
| style="background-color:" |
| style="text-align:left;" | Forza Italia 
| FI
| 55,144 || 11.15% || 7
|-
| style="background-color:" |
| style="text-align:left;" | Christian Democratic Centre (Centro Cristiano Democratico)
| CCD
| 25,480 || 5.15% || 3
|-
| style="background-color:" |
| style="text-align:left;" | Others 
| 
| 9,295 || 1.88% || 1
|- style="background-color:lightblue"
| colspan="4" style="text-align:left;" | Novi coalition (Centre-right)
| 146,013 || 29.52% || 18
|-
| style="background-color:black" |
| style="text-align:left;" colspan="2" | Tricolour Flame (Fiamma Tricolore) 
| MS-FT
| 5,207 || 1.05% || 0
|-
| style="background-color:" |
| style="text-align:left;" colspan="2" | Others 
| 
| 4,058 || 0.82% || 0
|-
| colspan="7" style="background-color:#E9E9E9" | 
|- style="font-weight:bold;"
| style="text-align:left;" colspan="4" | Total
| 494,655 || 100% || 60
|-
| colspan="7" style="background-color:#E9E9E9" | 
|-
| style="text-align:left;" colspan="4" | Votes cast / turnout 
| 587,285 || 68.17% || style="background-color:#E9E9E9;" |
|-
| style="text-align:left;" colspan="4" | Registered voters
| 861,455 ||  || style="background-color:#E9E9E9;" |
|-
| colspan="7" style="background-color:#E9E9E9" | 
|-
| style="text-align:left;" colspan="7" | Source: Ministry of the Interior
|}

Mayoral and city council election, 2001
The election took place in two rounds: the first on 13 May, the second on 27 May 2001.

Mayoral and city council election, 2006
The election took place on 28–29 May 2006.

Mayoral and city council election, 2011
The election took place in two rounds: the first on 15–16 May, the second on 29–30 May 2011.

|- style="background-color:#E9E9E9;text-align:center;"
! colspan="4" rowspan="1" style="text-align:left;" | Parties and coalitions
! colspan="1" | Votes
! colspan="1" | %
! colspan="1" | Seats
|-
| style="background-color:lightblue" rowspan="5" |
| style="background-color:" |
| style="text-align:left;" | The People of Freedom (Il Popolo delle Libertà)
| PdL
| 97,752 || 23.85% || 8
|-
| style="background-color:orange" |
| style="text-align:left;" | Force of the South (Forza del Sud)
| FdS
| 21,428 || 5.23% || 1
|-
| style="background-color:#1560BD" |
| style="text-align:left;" | We the South (Noi Sud)
| NS
| 14,658 || 3.58% || 1
|-
| style="background-color:#2E5894" |
| style="text-align:left;" | Lettieri List (Lista Lettieri)
| LL
| 12,571 || 3.07% || 1
|-
| style="background-color:" |
| style="text-align:left;" | Others 
| 
| 30,490 || 7.43% || 0
|- style="background-color:lightblue"
| colspan="4" style="text-align:left;" | Lettieri coalition (Centre-right)
| 176,901 || 43.16% || 11
|-
| style="background-color:pink" rowspan="3" |
| style="background-color:" |
| style="text-align:left;" | Democratic Party (Partito Democratico)
| PD
| 68,018 || 16.59% || 5
|-
| style="background-color:" |
| style="text-align:left;" | Left Ecology Freedom (Sinistra Ecologia Libertà)
| SEL
| 16,283 || 3.97% || 0
|-
| style="background-color:" |
| style="text-align:left;" | Others 
| 
| 8,682 || 2.12% || 0
|- style="background-color:pink"
| style="text-align:left;" colspan="4" | Morcone coalition (Centre-left)
| 92,983 || 22.68% || 5
|-
| style="background-color:orange" rowspan="4" |
| style="background-color:orange" |
| style="text-align:left;" | Italy of Values (Italia dei Valori)
| IdV
| 33,320 || 8.13% || 15
|-
| style="background-color:#CD7F32" |
| style="text-align:left;" | Naples is Yours (Napoli è Tua)
| NT
| 18,902 || 4.61% || 8
|-
| style="background-color:" |
| style="text-align:left;" | Federation of the Left (Federazione della Sinistra)
| FdS
| 15,008 || 3.66% || 6
|-
| style="background-color:" |
| style="text-align:left;" | Others 
| 
| 1,292 || 0.32% || 0
|- style="background-color:orange"
| colspan="4" style="text-align:left;" | De Magistris coalition (Left-wing)
| 68,522 || 16.72% ||  29
|-
| style="background-color:skyblue" rowspan="4" |
| style="background-color:" |
| style="text-align:left;" | Union of the Centre (Unione di Centro)
| UDC
| 21,335 || 5.21% || 2
|-
| style="background-color:" |
| style="text-align:left;" | Future and Freedom (Futuro e Libertà)
| FLI
| 13,807 || 3.37% || 1
|-
| style="background-color:" |
| style="text-align:left;" | Alliance for Italy (Alleanza per l'Italia)
| ApI
| 6,003 || 1.46% || 0
|-
| style="background-color:" |
| style="text-align:left;" | Others 
| 
| 5,904 || 1.44% || 0
|- style="background-color:skyblue"
| style="text-align:left;" colspan="4" | Pasquino coalition (Centre)
| 47,069 || 11.48% || 3
|-
| style="background-color:" |
| style="text-align:left;" colspan="2" | Others 
| 
| 24,420 || 5.96% || 0
|-
| colspan="7" style="background-color:#E9E9E9" | 
|- style="font-weight:bold;"
| style="text-align:left;" colspan="4" | Total
| 409,895 || 100% || 48
|-
| colspan="7" style="background-color:#E9E9E9" | 
|-
| style="text-align:left;" colspan="4" | Votes cast / turnout 
| 490,142 || 60.33% || style="background-color:#E9E9E9;" |
|-
| style="text-align:left;" colspan="4" | Registered voters
| 812,450 ||  || style="background-color:#E9E9E9;" |
|-
| colspan="7" style="background-color:#E9E9E9" | 
|-
| style="text-align:left;" colspan="7" | Source: Ministry of the Interior
|}

Mayoral and city council election, 2016

The election took place in two rounds, the first on 5 June and the second on 19 June 2016.

|- style="background-color:#E9E9E9;text-align:center;"
! colspan="4" rowspan="1" style="text-align:left;" | Parties and coalitions
! colspan="1" | Votes
! colspan="1" | %
! colspan="1" | Seats
|-
| style="background-color:orange" rowspan="5" |
| style="background-color:orange" |
| style="text-align:left;" | De Magistris List (Lista De Magistris)
| LDM
| 51,896 || 13.79% || 10
|-
| style="background-color:#E4590F" |
| style="text-align:left;" | Democracy and Autonomy (Democrazia e Autonomia)
| DemA
| 28,587 || 7.60% || 5
|-
| style="background-color:" |
| style="text-align:left;" | Naples in Common to the Left (Napoli in Comune a Sinistra)
| NCS
| 19,945 || 5.30% || 4
|-
| style="background-color:" |
| style="text-align:left;" | Federation of the Greens (Federazione dei Verdi)
| FdV
| 11,341 || 3.01% || 2
|-
| style="background-color:" |
| style="text-align:left;" | Others 
| 
| 37,971 || 10.08% || 3
|- style="background-color:orange"
| colspan="4" style="text-align:left;" | De Magistris coalition (Left-wing)
| 149,740 || 39.80% || 24
|-
| style="background-color:lightblue" rowspan="3" |
| style="background-color:" |
| style="text-align:left;" | Forza Italia 
| FI
| 36,145 || 9.61% || 4
|-
| style="background-color:#2E5894" |
| style="text-align:left;" | Lettieri List (Lista Lettieri)
| LL
| 28,869 || 7.67% || 2
|-
| style="background-color:" |
| style="text-align:left;" | Others 
| 
| 27,347 || 7.27% || 1
|- style="background-color:lightblue"
| colspan="4" style="text-align:left;" | Lettieri coalition (Centre-right)
| 92,361 || 24.55% || 7
|-
| style="background-color:pink" rowspan="3" |
| style="background-color:" |
| style="text-align:left;" | Democratic Party (Partito Democratico)
| PD
| 43,790 || 11.64% || 6
|-
| style="background-color:" |
| style="text-align:left;" | Popular Area (Area Popolare)
| AP
| 7,521 || 2.00% || 1
|-
| style="background-color:" |
| style="text-align:left;" | Others 
| 
| 37,675 || 10.01% || 0
|- style="background-color:pink"
| style="text-align:left;" colspan="4" | Valente coalition (Centre-left)
| 88,986 || 23.65% || 7
|-
| style="background-color:" |
| style="text-align:left;" colspan="2" | Five Star Movement (Movimento Cinque Stelle) 
| M5S
| 36,359 || 9.66% || 2
|-
| style="background-color:" |
| style="text-align:left;" colspan="2" | Others 
| 
| 8,817 || 2.35% || 0
|-
| colspan="7" style="background-color:#E9E9E9" | 
|- style="font-weight:bold;"
| style="text-align:left;" colspan="4" | Total
| 376,263 || 100% || 40
|-
| colspan="7" style="background-color:#E9E9E9" | 
|-
| style="text-align:left;" colspan="4" | Votes cast / turnout 
| 426,602 || 54.12% || style="background-color:#E9E9E9;" |
|-
| style="text-align:left;" colspan="4" | Registered voters
| 788,291 ||  || style="background-color:#E9E9E9;" |
|-
| colspan="7" style="background-color:#E9E9E9" | 
|-
| style="text-align:left;" colspan="7" | Source: Ministry of the Interior
|}

Notes

Naples
Naples
Politics of Campania
21st century in Naples
Elections in Campania